Octabenzone (Spectra-Sorb UV 531, MPI Milestab 81) is a UV absorber/screener. It is used to protect polymers (e.g., polyethylene, polypropylene, polyvinylchloride) against damage by UV light.

Phenols
Benzophenones
Phenol ethers